The Minnesota Farmer–Labor Party (FL)  was a left-wing American political party in Minnesota between 1918 and 1944. Largely dominating Minnesota politics during the Great Depression, it was one of the most successful statewide third party movements in United States history and the longest-lasting affiliate of the national Farmer–Labor movement. At its height in the 1920s and 1930s, party members included three Minnesota governors, four United States senators, eight United States representatives and a majority in the Minnesota legislature.

In 1944, Hubert H. Humphrey and Elmer Benson worked to merge the party with the state's Democratic Party, forming the contemporary Minnesota Democratic–Farmer–Labor Party.

History

 The Minnesota Farmer–Labor Party emerged from the Nonpartisan League in North Dakota and the Union Labor Party in Duluth, Minnesota, on a platform of farmer and labor union protection, government ownership of certain industries, and social security laws. In 1936 it was informally allied with the New Deal coalition and supported the reelection of President Franklin Roosevelt.Roosevelt was building a national coalition and wanted a solid base in Minnesota, where the Democrats were a weak third party. Roosevelt had a deal with Governor Olson whereby the FLP would get federal patronage, and in turn the FLP would work to block a third-party ticket against Roosevelt in 1936.

One of the primary obstacles of the party, besides constant vilification on the pages of local and state newspapers, was the difficulty of uniting the party's divergent base and maintaining political union between rural farmers and urban laborers who often had little in common other than the populist perception that they were an oppressed class of hardworking producers exploited by a small elite. A powerful pro-Communist element wanted fusion during World War II to ensure solidarity between the USSR and the USA, as partners against the Nazis. 

According to political scientist George Mayer:
The farmer approached problems as a proprietor or petty capitalist. Relief to him meant a mitigation of conditions that interfered with successful farming. It involved such things as tax reduction, easier access to credit, and a floor under farm prices. His individualist psychology did not create scruples against government aid, but he welcomed it only as long as it improved agricultural conditions. When official paternalism took the form of public works or the dole, he openly opposed it because assistance on such terms forced him to abandon his chosen profession, to submerge his individuality in the labor crew, and to suffer the humiliation of the bread line. Besides, a public works program required increased revenue, and since the state relied heavily on the property tax, the cost of the program seemed likely to fall primarily on him.

At the opposite end of the seesaw sat the city worker, who sought relief from the hunger, exposure, and disease that followed the wake of unemployment. Dependent on an impersonal industrial machine, he had sloughed off the frontier tradition of individualism for the more serviceable doctrine of cooperation through trade unionism. Unlike the depressed farmer, the unemployed worker often had no property or economic stake to protect. He was largely immune to taxation and had nothing to lose by backing proposals to dilute property rights or redistribute the wealth. Driven by the primitive instinct to survive, the worker demanded financial relief measures from the state. 

The New Deal farm programs made the American Farm Bureau Federation the main organization for farmers. It was hostile to the FLP, leaving the FLP without power regarding farm economics.

The Minnesota Democratic Party, led by Hubert Humphrey, was able to absorb the Farmer–Labor Party on April 15, 1944, creating the Minnesota Democratic–Farmer–Labor Party. Humphrey and his team expelled the Communist element from the new organization.

Notable members

Notable politicians elected

Governors of Minnesota who were Farmer–Labor:
Floyd B. Olson (1931–1936)
Hjalmar Petersen (1936–1937)
Elmer Austin Benson (1937–1939)
United States senators from Minnesota who were Farmer–Labor:
Henrik Shipstead (1923–1941); later became a Republican
Magnus Johnson (1923–1925)
Elmer Austin Benson (1935–1937)
Ernest Lundeen (1937–1940)
United States representatives from Minnesota who were Farmer–Labor:
William Leighton Carss (1919–1921, 1925–1929)
Ole J. Kvale (1923–1929)
Knud Wefald (1923–1927)
Paul John Kvale (1929–1939)
Henry M. Arens (1933–1935)
Magnus Johnson (1933–1935)
Ernest Lundeen (1933–1937); had previously served as a Republican Representative (1915–1917), also served in the Senate
Francis Shoemaker (1933–1935)
John T. Bernard (1937–1939)
Minnesota Legislators who were Farmer–Labor:
Samuel H. Bellman (1935–1938)
John W. Cox (1935–1938)

Electoral history

Minnesota state offices

Minnesota federal offices

See also
 New Deal coalition

References

Further reading
 Benson, Elmer A. "Politics in My Lifetime." Minnesota History 47 (1980): 154-60. online
 Delton, Jennifer. Making Minnesota Liberal: Civil Rights and the Transformation of the Democratic Party (2002) focus on how Humphrey used race issue to take over FLP.. 

 Garlid, George W. "The Antiwar Dilemma of the Farmer-Labor Party." Minnesota History (1967): 365-374. in JSTOR
Gieske, Millard L. Minnesota Farmer-Laborism: The Third-Party Alternative (1979) 389pp
 Haynes, John Earl. Dubious alliance: the making of Minnesota's DFL Party (U of Minnesota Press, 1984)
 Haynes, John Earl. "Farm Coops and the Election of Hubert Humphrey to the Senate." Agricultural History (1983): 201-211. in JSTOR
 Haynes, John Earl. "The new history of the communist party in state politics: The implications for mainstream political history." Labor History (1986) 27#4 pp: 549-563.
 Hyman, Colette A. "Culture as Strategy: Popular Front Politics and the Minneapolis Theatre Union, 1935-39." Minnesota History (1991): 294-306.  in JSTOR
 Lovin, Hugh T. "The Fall of Farmer-Labor Parties, 1936-1938." Pacific Northwest Quarterly (1971): 16-26. in JSTOR
 McCoy, Donald R. Angry voices: Left-of-center politics in the New Deal era (1958; reprint 2012) 
 Mayer, George H. The Political Career of Floyd B. Olson (1987)
 Mitau, G. Theodore. "The Democratic-Farmer-Labor Party Schism of 1948." Minnesota History (1955): 187-194. in JSTOR
 Naftalin, Arthur. "The Tradition of Protest and the Roots of the Farmer-Labor Party." Minnesota History 35.2 (1956): 53-63. online
 Rude, Leslie G. "The rhetoric of farmer‐labor agitators." Communication Studies 20.4 (1969): 280-285.

 Sofchalk, Donald G. "Union and Ethnic Group Influence in the 1938 Election on the Minnesota Iron Ranges." Journal of the West (2003) 42#3 pp: 66-74.
 Valelly, Richard M.  Radicalism in the States:  The Minnesota Farmer-Labor Party and the American Political Economy (University of Chicago Press, 1989)

External links
 Article on the Minnesota Farmer–Labor party from The Progressive Populist
 Minnesota Farmer–Labor
 Farmer–Labor information page
 The Farmer Labor Party 1918–1924 Organizational history of attempts to form a national Farmer–Labor Party. Marxist Internet Archive.  Retrieved May 26, 2006.
 TOWARD THE COOPERATIVE COMMONWEALTH: AN INTRODUCTORY HISTORY OF THE FARMER–LABOR MOVEMENT IN MINNESOTA (1917–1948). 232 page online copy of Thomas Gerald O'Connell's 1979 Phd thesis from The Union Institute.
 Luoma, Everett E.: The Farmer Takes A Holiday.  Exposition Press, 1967.

Agrarian parties in the United States
Defunct progressive parties in the United States
History of Minnesota
Labor parties in the United States
Political parties established in 1918
Political parties disestablished in 1944
Political parties in Minnesota
1918 establishments in Minnesota
Minnesota